Big Pine Creek is a creek in northwestern Indiana, USA. It begins in Round Grove Township in southwestern White County and flows generally southward  through Benton and Warren counties before meeting the Wabash River near the town of Attica. The lower section of the creek from Rainsville to the Wabash is used by canoeists, particularly during the spring when the water is at its highest, and local flora, fauna and geology can be observed.

Big Pine Creek, as measured at the USGS station at Pine Village, Indiana, is approximately 224 cubic feet per second.

The Friends of Big Pine Creek is a conservation organization dedicated to preservation and promotion of the Big Pine Creek watershed.

Tributaries
Numerous smaller streams feed the Big Pine Creek, of which the most significant are (from north to south).
 Mud Pine Creek
 Spring Branch
 Fall Creek

See also
List of rivers of Indiana

References

External links
Friends of Big Pine Creek

Rivers of Benton County, Indiana
Rivers of Indiana
Tributaries of the Wabash River
Rivers of Warren County, Indiana
Rivers of White County, Indiana